8 Marta is a rural locality (a settlement) in Verkh-Tulinskoye Rural Settlement of Novosibirsky District, Russia. The population was 334 as of 2010.

Streets 
 Mira
 Mira 3 etazhka
 Stroiteley

Geography 
8 Marta is located 18 km southwest of Novosibirsk (the district's administrative centre) by road. Krasny Vostok is the nearest rural locality.

References 

Rural localities in Novosibirsk Oblast
Novosibirsky District